Austin William Erwin (April 26, 1887 – August 14, 1965) was an American lawyer and politician from New York.

Life
He was born on April 26, 1887, in West Sparta, Livingston County, New York. He attended Geneseo State Normal School and Columbia University.

He was District Attorney of Livingston County from 1924 to 1932; and was President of the New York State District Attorneys Association in 1932.

On February 15, 1944, he was elected to the New York State Senate, to fill the vacancy caused by the resignation of Joe R. Hanley. Erwin was re-elected several times and remained in the State Senate until 1962, sitting in the 164th, 165th, 166th, 167th, 168th, 169th, 170th, 171st, 172nd and 173rd New York State Legislatures. He was Chairman of the Committee on Finance from 1954 to 1962.

He died on August 14, 1965, at his summer residence on Conesus Lake.

Sources

1887 births
1965 deaths
People from Livingston County, New York
Republican Party New York (state) state senators
County district attorneys in New York (state)
Columbia University alumni
20th-century American politicians